Medaw Shwezaga is one of the 37 nats in the Burmese pantheon of nats. She was one of queens consort of the King Uzana II of Pagan, the last "king" of the Pagan dynasty. The mother of Shwe Sitthin, she died of heartbreak over the sorrowful plight of her son. She is portrayed sitting on a pedestal with her right hand on her bosom and her left hand resting on her lap.

References

20
Burmese goddesses